John Ludwig Wees (1861 - 1942) was an architect in the United States. Several buildings he designed in St. Louis, Missouri and Paris, Texas are listed on the National Register of Historic Places. He immigrated to the United States and moved west to St. Louis where he eventually became a partner at the firm Beinke & Wees.

He was involved in a lawsuit seeking fees for work he did while part of Beinke & Wees. He moved to Paris, Texas after a fire destroyed part of its downtown.

Work
Beethoven Conservatory, 2301 Locust St. in St. Louis (Beinke & Wees). NRHP listed
Lewis Dozier Mansion in St. Louis
1907 Dorris Motor Car Company Building at  4063-4065 Forest Park Avenue in St. Louis, NRHP listed
Dorris Motor Car Company building at  4100 Laclede in St. Louis 
Old B'nai El Temple, 3666 Flad Avenue in St. Louis. NRHP listed.
Edwin F. Guth Company Complex at  2615 Washington Avenue in St. Louis, NRHP listed
Halsey-Packard Building, 2201-11 Locust in St. Louis. NRHP listed
Lister Building, 4500 Olive St. in St. Louis. NRHP listed.
Scott-Roden Mansion, 425 S. Church St. in Paris, Texas. NRHP listed
Building in Paris Commercial Historic District in Paris, Texas

References

1861 births
1942 deaths